Johann Brandweiner (24 September 1894 – 7 January 1974) was an Austrian footballer. He played in two matches for the Austria national football team in 1919.

References

External links
 

1894 births
1974 deaths
Austrian footballers
Austria international footballers
Place of birth missing
Association football goalkeepers
Wiener AC players